Rochford is a surname. Notable people with the surname include:

Andrew Rochford (born 1979), Australian television presenter
Bernard Rochford (born 1979), Irish hurler
Bill Rochford (1913–1984), British footballer
Jack Rochford (1882–1953), Irish hurler
Jane Boleyn, Viscountess Rochford
John Rochford (died 1410), English politician
Leonard Henry Rochford (1893–1986), British World War I flying ace
Mick Rochford (1890–?), Irish hurler
Mike Rochford (born 1963), American baseball player
Peter Rochford (1928–1992), English cricketer
Seb Rochford, British drummer
Stephen Rochford (born 1978), Irish Gaelic football player and manager